The Oceania Qualification Tournament for the Taekwondo at the 2008 Summer Olympics was held in Noumea, New Caledonia on December 1, 2007. The winner of each event qualified for the Olympics.

Men's

Flyweight (-58kg)

December 1

Featherweight (-68kg)

December 1

Welterweight (-80kg)

December 1

Heavyweight (+80kg)

December 1

Women's Taekwondo

Flyweight (-49kg)
December 1

Featherweight (-57kg)

December 1

Welterweight (-67kg)

December 1

Heavyweight (+67kg)
December 1

Taekwondo competitions
Taekwondo
2007 in taekwondo
2007 in Oceanian sport
2007 in New Caledonian sport